For the 1987–88 season, Norwich City F.C. competed in Football League Division One, as well as the FA Cup, Littlewoods Cup and Simod Cup.

Overview
The previous season had seen Norwich finish fifth in Division One, their highest position to that date, but any hope of a repeat was quickly dashed. By the beginning of November, Norwich had only registered three league wins, and would soon after slip to bottom of the table after only winning one point from five matches. Chairman Robert Chase took drastic action: On 9 November, long-serving manager Ken Brown was sacked. Dave Stringer, who had only become his assistant at the start of the year after previously being reserve team manager, was appointed as his replacement, initially on a caretaker basis and later permanent. Veteran player David Williams was made a player/coach as his assistant.

The trend was not immediately reversed and in December club captain Steve Bruce left the club for Manchester United. His vice-captain Mike Phelan replaced him as captain. With the money from the sale, Norwich acquired Robert Fleck, who would contribute seven goals in the second half of the season and be the club's leading scorer for the next four seasons, as well as buying Andy Linighan as a replacement for Bruce at centre-half. One of the most unfortunate incidents of the year surrounded John O'Neill, who signed for the club in December only to suffer a career-ending knee injury on his debut, after which he never played professionally again.

Norwich made early exits from all three cup competitions but six wins and six draws in the latter half of the season were enough to secure them another season in the top flight as they finished in 14th place, four places and three points clear of the relegation play-offs. Their biggest win of the season was 4–1 against West Ham United and their heaviest defeat was 3–0, which occurred four times. Their highest scoring game was 4–2 which happened twice, a defeat to Arsenal and a victory over Oxford United.

Squad
Squad at the end of season (7 May 1988)

Transfers

In

Out

Final table

Results

Division One

 Source:

FA Cup

Source:

Littlewoods Cup

 Source:

Simod Cup

Source:

Appearances

 Source:

Goalscorers

 Source:

References

Bibliography
 Canary Citizens Centenary Edition: Authors Mike Davage, John Eastwood and Kevan Platt 
 Barclays League Club Directory 1989: Editor Tony Williams 
 Norwich City: The Modern Era: Author Rob Hadgraft 
 News of the World Football Annual 1988-89 Editors Bill Bateson and Albert Sewell 
 Barclays League Club Directory 1993: Editor Tony Williams 

Norwich City F.C. seasons
Norwich City